The Night & Day Café is a café bar and live music venue in Manchester, England.

Location 
It is located in the city's Northern Quarter on Oldham Street, opposite Piccadilly Records. It is near the Afflecks palace shopping arcade and a few minutes' walk from the Market Street/Arndale Centre shopping areas.

History 
The Night & Day opened in 1991 in a former chip shop in what was (at the time) one of the more desolate parts of town. First owned by Jan Oldenburg, it slowly developed into a music venue and gained a reputation for pioneering live music and supporting alternative bands. When the venue faced the threat of closure Elbow’s Guy Garvey told radio station XFM that the venue had been crucial to his band's career and that it deserved protected status and a blue plaque.

As of 2018, the venue is managed by Oldenburg's daughter and her husband.

Live music 
The café has played an important role in the Manchester music scene, with many successful bands playing early gigs there. Elbow played at the venue before it had a proper stage and lead singer Garvey claims he used to give out Night & Day's phone number as a contact number because members of the band were so often in the venue.

Other artists who have played at the venue include Kasabian, Jessie J, Paulo Nutini, the Arctic Monkeys and the Manic Street Preachers. It was also used as the filming location for the music video which accompanied Johnny Marr's single "Dynamo".

Threats of closure 
In January 2014, the Night & Day was threatened with permanent closure after a resident in the neighbouring flats complained about noise, and Manchester City Council issued a nuisance notice. Speaking to the Manchester Evening News, the Night & Day's promoter and booker said that having to turn noise levels down would discourage bands from playing, and that a fine would ruin the venue. Musicians including Johnny Marr, Frank Turner and Tim Burgess stepped in to show their support for the venue and a petition was set up which gained thousands of signatures. However, the fight quickly became inflamed with the then owner Jan Oldenburg saying that he felt he was being portrayed as uncooperative and the complainant revealing that he had received death threats.

In May 2014, it was reported that the Music Venue Trust had lent their support to the Night & Day's campaign, with a national petition which called for an urgent review of noise abatement legislation for bars and venues in the UK and in September of the same year it was reported that the Night & Day would be able to keep its licence if staff agreed to regularly meet with residents to discuss any issues.

In November 2021, the venue was served with a noise abatement notice from Manchester City Council. This was following ongoing complaints from a local resident who had moved into the area during the COVID-19 pandemic, when the venue was not open as usual. The owners of Night & Day have said that the venue faces closure as a result.

Subsequently, a petition was launched to remove the abatement order and has gained over 94,000 signatures. In addition, various local businesses, residents and local bands as well as some high profile Musicians took to social media in support of the venue. These included Elbow, The Charlatans and Johnny Marr.

References in popular culture 
The venue was mentioned in the hit American TV drama Lost in the season three episode 21 "Greatest Hits" as the place where Mancunian character Charlie's band DriveShaft played their first gig.

In 2018, the venue doubled as "Heaven", a bar in the Michael C. Hall Netflix drama Safe.

References

External links
 The Night & Day website
 The Night & Day Twitter

Buildings and structures in Manchester
Restaurants established in 1991
Music venues in Manchester
1991 establishments in England